Michail Misunov (alternate spelling: Misounof) ((Michalis Misunov); born 27 May 1964) is a retired Russian professional basketball player with descent from North Macedonia and Greece. Born in Moscow, Misunov started his professional career with KK Šibenka. Subsequently, he moved to the Greek team Aris, with whom he won several national domestic and international trophies. He also played for Iraklis, Siena, and Gostivar.

Early life
He was born in Moscow to a Russian father and an ethnic Greek mother from North Macedonia.

Professional career
Misunov started his career in Šibenik with Šibenka's basketball club, and he played in Aris in the period of 1987–1997. With Aris, he won Greek League 4 championships (1988, 1989, 1990, 1991), and 4 Greek Cups (1988, 1989, 1990, 1992). In 1993, he also won the 2nd-tier European Cup. He also played with Iraklis, Siena, and Gostivar.

References

External links
FIBA Europe Profile
Eurobasket.com Profile

1964 births
Living people
Aris B.C. players
Greek men's basketball players
Iraklis Thessaloniki B.C. players
KK Šibenik players
Expatriate sportspeople in Yugoslavia
Macedonian men's basketball players
Mens Sana Basket players
Papagou B.C. players
Power forwards (basketball)
Russian people of Greek descent
Basketball players from Moscow